Sharlston is a village and civil parish, situated  east of Wakefield in West Yorkshire, England, and includes the settlements of Old Sharlston, Sharlston Common and New Sharlston. Its population at the 2001 census was 2,756, reducing to 2,663 at the 2011 Census.  The village lies in the City of Wakefield unitary district.

History
The village of Old Sharlston has existed for over five hundred years, with the oldest known record indicating that Sharlston Old Hall was built in 1574. In the early 18th century, the village was acquired by the Earl of Westmorland.

Sharlston's listed buildings and structures are grouped around Grade II* Sharlston Hall, a manor house of 15th century origin with later additions, and include the hall's entrance gateway.

Until April 1929 Sharlston formed part of the Warmfield parish, but is now managed by its own parish council.

Pit village
A pit or model village of more than 150 back-to-back houses was built at New Sharlston from 1864 to house Sharlston Colliery Company workers. The houses cost just over £100 each and the streets were named Long Row, Crossley Street and High Street. A Methodist chapel and a day school were built on Crossley Street. The properties became the property of the National Coal Board in 1947. In 1961 twenty eight back-to-back houses were converted into 14 through houses. The school and the chapel have been demolished.

New Sharlston has witnessed rapid decline since the 1984-85 miners' strike which hit Sharlston and its surrounding villages hard.

Development

In 2011 the village old people's home was demolished and replaced with new builds for rent and sale.
A village public house, The Sharlston, has closed, the building being converted to a pharmacy.

Sport
The village has an amateur rugby league team, Sharlston Rovers, which recently won the Wakefield Division 2 Cup. There is also a juniors team, the teams in 2017 are under 11s,under 9s,under 8s,under 7s,under 6s,under 5s and tots.

References

External links

Sharlston Rovers. Retrieved 10 January 2012

Villages in West Yorkshire
Geography of the City of Wakefield
Civil parishes in West Yorkshire